"Setting the World on Fire" is a song written by Ross Copperman, Matt Jenkins, and Josh Osborne and recorded by American country music artist Kenny Chesney as a duet with American singer Pink. It was released to country radio on July 28, 2016 and to digital retailers the following day as the second single from Chesney's 2016 album Cosmic Hallelujah. The song was also promoted to adult and pop radio on September 12, 2016. The song was nominated for the Best Country Duo/Group Performance at the 2017 Grammy Awards.

Commercial performance
"Setting the World on Fire" debuted at number 26 on the Australian Singles Chart, becoming Chesney's first ever song to chart in Australia.

In Canada, the song debuted at number 47 on the Canada Country chart and has reached number one and debuted at number 67 on the Canadian Hot 100 and peaked at number 48.

In the United States, the song sold 93,000 copies during its first week, marking Chesney's biggest sales week for a single, surpassing the previous best sales week of his 2012 hit "Feel Like a Rock Star". It was the second best-selling song for the week of August 20, 2016. It concurrently debuted at number 29 on the US Billboard Hot 100, becoming Chesney's twenty-fifth top 40 hit on the all-genre chart. It also rose from number 43 to number two on Hot Country Songs chart, eventually peaking at number one. On the Country Airplay chart, it debuted at number 22 and has reached number one. "Setting the World on Fire" debuted at number 35 on the Adult Pop Songs chart for the week of October 8, 2016 and is Chesney's first entry on the chart.

As of January 2017, it has sold 624,000 copies in the United States.

Music video
The music video was directed by P. R. Brown, and premiered in September 2016. Neither Chesney nor Pink are featured in the music video, except for various posters and billboards displaying the collaboration. The music video is in black and white, and tells the story of two young lovers who move to Los Angeles and have a romantic encounter, as described in the song's lyrics. It was filmed around Los Angeles and Riverside, California over two days in August 2016.

Personnel
 Kenny Chesney – lead vocals
 Chad Cromwell – drums
 Kenny Greenberg – electric guitar
 David Huff – programming
 Pink – duet vocals
 Danny Rader – acoustic guitar
 Mike Rojas – synthesizer
 F. Reid Shippen – programming
 Jimmie Lee Sloas – bass guitar
 Derek Wells – electric guitar

Charts

Weekly charts

Year end charts

Decade-end charts

Certifications

Release history

References

2016 songs
2016 singles
Kenny Chesney songs
Pink (singer) songs
Columbia Nashville Records singles
Songs written by Ross Copperman
Songs written by Matt Jenkins
Songs written by Josh Osborne
Song recordings produced by Buddy Cannon
Columbia Records singles
Country ballads
Pop ballads
Male–female vocal duets